Djamel Belmadi (born 25 March 1976) is a professional football coach and former player who manages the Algeria national team.

As a player he was midfielder who had spells in Ligue 1 with Paris Saint-Germain, Marseille, Cannes and Valenciennes. He also briefly played in La Liga for Celta Vigo and in the Premier League for Manchester City. Later on in his career he returned to England and played several seasons at Southampton whilst the club were in the Football League. He also played for Martigues, Al-Ittihad and Al-Kharitiyath. Born in France, he played internationally for Algeria and was capped 20 times.

As a coach he has managed Lekhwiya, Qatar B, Qatar, Al-Duhail and currently Algeria.

Club career

France and Spain
Born in Champigny-sur-Marne, France, Belmadi started his career at Paris Saint-Germain, making his debut in January 1996 against Gueugnon before spending a season at Martigues. He spent the 1997–98 season at Marseille, and then moved to Cannes for the 1998–99 season. In August 1999, he was signed again by Marseille, but immediately went on loan to Spanish club Celta Vigo.

In January 2000, Belmadi returned to Marseille, eventually securing a regular place in the first team's midfield in 2000–01. In January 2001, he made good use of a rare opportunity presented him to play in Marseille's attack, when Liberian maestro George Weah—who had been the main attacker—was away on international duty with the Lone Stars of Liberia. Belmadi seized the opportunity to score a vital goal for Marseille against fellow strugglers Toulouse to keep Marseille just outside the relegation zone.

On 14 April 2001, he scored the winning goal in Marseille's 2–1 victory over Sedan, before a near–60,000 crowd, giving Bernard Tapie's team a much needed lifeline out of relegation.

Manchester City
In January 2003, Belmadi had fallen out of favour at Marseille, now managed by Alain Perrin, who agreed to loan him to Kevin Keegan’s Manchester City after a successful trial. He joined ranks with fellow Algerian, Ali Benarbia.

He made his full debut for Manchester City on 29 January 2003 at Maine Road in a 4–1 victory against Fulham (alongside another recruit from the French league – David Sommeil).

In Belmadi's brief time at Manchester City, he only made 2 starts and 6 substitute appearances, the last of which was in a 1–0 defeat against Southampton on 11 May 2003 in the final league game at Maine Road. The only goal was scored by Michael Svensson.

Although Kevin Keegan liked Belmadi's style of play, he conceded that he could not afford another free spirit in a side already containing Eyal Berkovic and Ali Bernabia, so Belmadi returned to Marseille.

In August 2003, he was released by Marseille and played the 2003–04 and 2004–05 seasons in Qatar with Al-Ittihad and Al-Kharitiyath.

Southampton
In July 2005, after trials at Celtic, Wigan Athletic and Sunderland, Belmadi joined Southampton (then playing in the Football League Championship) for their pre-season tour of Scotland. Harry Redknapp initially gave Belmadi a one-month contract, and he made his debut on 6 August 2005 in a 0–0 draw against Wolverhampton Wanderers. His contract was extended until the end of the 2005–06 season after impressive performances in his early games, including a goal against Crewe Alexandra on 27 August 2005. In January 2006, he picked up a thigh injury, which put him out of the team until April.

Belmadi had, however, done enough to persuade Southampton, now managed by George Burley, to re-sign him for the 2006–07 season. This was again blighted by injury problems, including a knee injury picked up in September, which put him out until February. He picked up several other niggling injuries putting him out for long periods. When fit, there was no doubting Belmadi's ability and quality on the ball whether playing on the left or right of midfield. At his best, he could unpick defenses with his passing and kept the ball well. Unfortunately, his injuries restricted him to 40 appearances in his two years at St Mary's. His contract with the Saints expired on 30 June 2007 and was not renewed as Southampton faced up to the financial realities of a third season in the Championship.

Valenciennes
After being released by Southampton, Belmadi returned to France and joined Valenciennes. He retired from football in 2009.

International career
Belmadi made his debut for Algeria on 9 July 2000 against Morocco. He was part of the Algerian 2004 African Nations Cup team, who finished second in their group in the first round of competition before being defeated by Morocco in the quarter-finals. Belmadi last played for Algeria in a World Cup qualifier against Zimbabwe on 20 June 2004, having made 20 appearances and scoring 5 goals.

Managerial career

Lekhwiya

In the summer of 2010, Belmadi was appointed as the head coach of newly promoted Qatar Stars League club Lekhwiya. In his first season with the club, he led them to the 2010–11 Qatar Stars League title for the first time in the club's history. He also led them to the final of the 2010 Sheikh Jassem Cup, where they lost to Al Arabi.
For the second time, Lekhwiya won the 2011–12 Qatar Stars League title, under the management of Belmadi. He resigned on 8 October 2012 after a bad start of the 2012–13 season.

Qatar B
In December 2013, Belmadi was appointed as head coach of the Qatar B team, which was set to participate in the 2014 WAFF Championship on home soil. He called up a number of foreigners to the national team, including compatriots Boualem Khoukhi and Karim Boudiaf after being informed by the QFA that they were eligible to compete for Qatar. Qatar were crowned champions of the 2014 WAFF Championship after defeating Jordan on 7 January. They finished the tournament undefeated, with 10 goals scored and a single goal conceded.

Qatar senior team
On 15 March 2014, Belmadi was unveiled as the new head coach of the Qatar senior football team, replacing Fahad Thani. His first match as Qatar coach was a 0–0 draw with Macedonia. He led his team to a notable 1–0 first-ever victory over Australia in a friendly match on 14 October 2014, after having posted a 5–0 win over Lebanon and a 3–0 victory over Uzbekistan in their two previous matches. In correspondence to Qatar's performance in the aforementioned friendly matches, sports channel Al Kass stated that Qatar is "showing signs of evolution with Belmadi" and that the team was "undergoing a renewal." He led Qatar to win the 2014 Gulf Cup of Nations by beating host Saudi Arabia in the final. However, Qatar showed a poor form in the 2015 AFC Asian Cup and was eliminated in the group stages after three consecutive defeats by United Arab Emirates, Iran and Bahrain. He was dismissed from his post on 30 April 2015.

Al-Duhail
On 19 June 2015, Belmadi was appointed for the second time in his career to coach Lekhwiya; he was a replacement for Michael Laudrup.

Algeria
On 2 August 2018, Belmadi became the manager of the Algeria national team. At his second international football championship (having coached Qatar in the 2015 AFC Asian Cup), Belmadi's Algerian team was not considered a serious contender for the trophy because Algeria's performance in the 2019 Africa Cup of Nations qualification was not promising, despite topping the group with two draws to Gambia and an away-loss to Benin. The unimpressive qualification campaign increased the pressure on Belmadi.

Despite heavy criticism, Belmadi led Algeria to success and earned his first international trophy. Algeria defeated every opponent on its road to the final of the 2019 Africa Cup of Nations (AFCON) held in Egypt, including two victories over Senegal in the group stage and the final. Algeria won its second continental title and became the North African second team, after Egypt, to win more than one AFCON trophy.

Bank theft incident
While Belmadi was with Manchester City, he, along with players Daniel Van Buyten and Vicente Vuoso, were the victims of a theft by two bank workers. At the time that Belmadi left Manchester City, he left £230,000 in an account with the Co-operative Bank. In total, the bank workers stole more than £350,000 from the accounts of the three players.

In January 2006, the bank workers, Paul Sherwood, a cashier, and Paul Hanley, his supervisor, were jailed for 32 months and 12 months respectively.

Career statistics

Scores and results list Algeria's goal tally first, score column indicates score after each Belmadi goal.

Managerial statistics

Honours

As a player

Individual
DZFoot d'Or: 2000, 2001
Algerian Ballon d'or: 2001

As a manager
Al-Duhail
Qatar Stars League: 2010–11, 2011–12, 2016–17, 2017–18
Emir of Qatar Cup: 2016, 2018
Qatar Cup: 2018

Qatar B
WAFF Championship: 2014

Qatar
Gulf Cup of Nations: 2014

Algeria
Africa Cup of Nations: 2019

Individual
Qatar Stars League Manager of the Season : 2017–18
CAF Coach of the Year: 2019
IFFHS CAF Best National Coach: 2021

References

External links

 
 Southampton Profile
 Sporting Heroes article re Manchester City career
 Sporting Heroes article re 2004 African Cup of Nations
 

1976 births
Living people
People from Champigny-sur-Marne
Footballers from Val-de-Marne
Algerian footballers
French footballers
Paris Saint-Germain F.C. players
FC Martigues players
AS Cannes players
Olympique de Marseille players
Manchester City F.C. players
Southampton F.C. players
Valenciennes FC players
La Liga players
RC Celta de Vigo players
Al-Gharafa SC players
French sportspeople of Algerian descent
Ligue 1 players
Premier League players
Expatriate footballers in Qatar
Algeria international footballers
Expatriate footballers in England
Expatriate footballers in Spain
French expatriate footballers
French expatriate sportspeople in Spain
Al Kharaitiyat SC players
Algerian expatriate footballers
Algerian expatriate sportspeople in Spain
Algerian expatriate sportspeople in England
Expatriate football managers in Qatar
Algerian expatriate sportspeople in Qatar
Algerian football managers
Qatar Stars League players
Lekhwiya SC managers
2004 African Cup of Nations players
2015 AFC Asian Cup managers
Qatar national football team managers
Association football midfielders
Algeria national football team managers
2019 Africa Cup of Nations managers